is the 49th NHK Taiga drama. It was shown on NHK from January 3 to November 28, 2010, spanning 48 episodes. The story centers on the life of 19th-century Japanese historical figures Iwasaki Yatarō and Sakamoto Ryōma. It has been announced that the series will be aired in several other countries, for example Hong Kong, South Korea, Taiwan and Thailand.

Production

Production Credits
Original – Yasushi Fukuda
Music – Naoki Satō
Titling – Shishū
Narrator – Teruyuki Kagawa
Historical research – Manabu Ōishi, Tatsuya Yamamura
Architectural research – Sei Hirai
Clothing research – Kiyoko Koizumi
Beauty and costume direction – Isao Tsuge
Sword fight arranger - Kunishirō Hayashi
Production coordinator – Kei Suzuki, Kanako Iwatani
Casting – Keishi Ōtomo

Cast
Masaharu Fukuyama as 
Tatsuomi Hamada as young RyōmaSakamoto familyShinobu Terajima as  – older sister of Ryōma - later  
Tao Tsuchiya as young Otome
Kiyoshi Kodama as  – father of Ryōma
Tetta Sugimoto as  – oldest brother of Ryōma
Wakako Shimazaki as  – Gonpei's wife
Atsuko Maeda as  – Gonpei's daughter
Tamaki Matsumoto as young Harui
Rei Ōtori as  – oldest sister of Ryōma – later 
Chieko Matsubara as  – stepmother of Ryōma
Tamiyo Kusakari as  – mother of Ryōma
Yōko Maki as  – Ryōma's wifeIwasaki familyTeruyuki Kagawa as  – the founder of Mitsubishi, born in Tosa
Keizō Kanie as  – Yatarō's father
Mitsuko Baisho as  – Yatarō's mother
Maiko as  – Yatarō's wifeTosa clanMasaomi Kondō as  - the 15th head of the Tosa Domain
Munetaka Aoki as  – nephew of Yoshida Tōyō
Min Tanaka as 
Nao Ōmori as  – leader of the 
Ryōko Hirosue as  – first crush of Ryōma
Hiroyuki Miyasako as  – older brother of Kao
Takeru Satoh as  – assassin of the Bakumatsu period
Takaya Kamikawa as  – brethren of Ryōma, born in Tosa Domain
Pierre Taki as Chōshū clanKatsuhisa Namase as  – master of Katsura Kogorō
Shōsuke Tanihara as  – disciple of Yoshida Shōin
Yūsuke Iseya as 
Toshio Kakei as 
Kyōsuke Yabe as 
Hiroyuki Onoue as Satsuma clanKatsumi Takahashi as 
Mitsuhiro Oikawa as 
Kenichi Takitō as Chiba DojoShihori Kanjiya as  – daughter of Chiba Sadakichi
Kōtarō Satomi as  – management of sword school Chiba Dōjō
Ikkei Watanabe as  – older brother of Chiba Sanako

Tokugawa Bakufu
Tetsushi Tanaka as  – the 15th and last shōgun of the Tokugawa shogunate
Nakamura Hayato as  – the 14th shōgun of the Tokugawa shogunate
Tetsuya Takeda as  – a Japanese naval officer and statesman
Tortoise Matsumoto as  – one of the first Japanese people to visit the United States
Tomoharu Hasegawa as Matsudaira KatamoriShinsengumiTaizō Harada as  – the commander of the Shinsengumi
Satoshi Matsuda as  – the vice-commander of Shinsengumi
Rakuto Tochihara as  – the captain of the first unit of the ShinsengumiKyoto MimawarigumiKamejirō Ichikawa as 
Tatsuya Nakamura as 
SION as KaientaiYō Ōizumi as  – son of a bun store owner in Kōchi
Jun Kaname as 
Yūta Hiraoka as  – a statesman and diplomat in Meiji period, born in Wakayama domain
Kenta Kiritani as 
Daijirō Kawaoka as  – Ryōma's adopted child
Atsushi Korechika as People in NagasakiYū Aoi as  – geisha girl of restaurant in Maruyama
Hirotarō Honda as  – business tycoon in Nagasaki
Kimiko Yo as  – business tycoon
Terry Itō as  – photographerForeignersTimothy Harris as Matthew C. Perry – the Commodore of the U.S. Navy
Randy Buinz as Townsend Harris – a successful New York City merchant and minor politician
Tim Wellard as Thomas Blake Glover – trading merchant in Nagasaki, born in Scotland
Jeffrey Rowe as William Alt
Patrick Harlan as Ernest Satow
Daniel Foley as Rutherford Alcock
Péter Frankl as Léon Roches
Dennis Zomerhuis as Anton L. C. Portman

Season overview
The box set is available in a general DVD version, and a Blu-ray Disc version.

The 1st episode and last episodes are 75 minutes long. The others are 45 minutes long, excepting commercials.

Highlight

Navigator: Munetaka Aoki (Season 1, 2), Teruyuki Kagawa (Season 3, 4)

International

Soundtrack and books
Soundtrack
NHK Taiga Drama Ryōmaden Original Soundtrack Vol.1 (January 27, 2010)
NHK Taiga Drama Ryōmaden Original Soundtrack Vol.2 (May 26, 2010)
NHK Taiga Drama Ryōmaden Original Soundtrack Vol.3 (September 8, 2010)

BooksOfficial guideNHK Taiga Drama Story Ryōmaden First Part  (December 8, 2009)
NHK Taiga Drama Story Ryōmaden Latter Part  (June 30, 2010)
NHK Taiga Drama Story Ryōmaden Last Part  (October 22, 2010)
NHK Taiga Drama, Historical Handbook, Ryōmaden  (November 19, 2009)NovelRyōmaden I SEASON1 RYOMA THE DREAMER  (November 28, 2009)
Ryōmaden II SEASON2 RYOMA THE ADVENTURER  (March 25, 2010)
Ryōmaden III SEASON3 RYOMA THE NAVIGATOR  (July 17, 2010)
Ryōmaden IV SEASON4 RYOMA THE HOPE  (October 9, 2010)Photo albumMasaharu Fukuyama - Sakamoto Ryōma Photo Album  (July 1, 2010)
Oryō - Yōko Maki Photo Album  (September 22, 2010)
2010 Years, the Journey with Masaharu Fukuyama and Ryōma Sakamoto  (December 9, 2010)Comics and other'Ryōmaden, Comic Version, First Volume  (January 25, 2010)Ryōmaden, Comic Version, Second Volume  (April 19, 2010)Ryōma Design.  (November 2010)

Reception
ImpactRyōmaden'' made a huge impact in Japan. Kōchi, Sakamoto Ryoma's birthplace reported an increase in tourism when the drama started airing. The Bank of Japan (Koichi Branch) initially estimated the economic benefit to be around 23.4 billion yen. However, they have revised the estimation to 40.9 billion yen in April 2010, due to an increase in tourism because of 'Ryoma Fever.' The final estimation is around 52.5 billion yen, 2.3 times the value from the initial estimation. The Nagasaki Branch also estimated around 21 billion yen of economic benefit to Nagasaki, the place where Ryoma was in the Kaientai business. Copies of the necklace Ryoma wore are selling well, and it is the number one selling item in the NHK gift shop.

Accolades
2010 Teamwork of the Year Award
Hashida Sugako Awards :ja:橋田賞 - Fukuyama Masaharu in Ryomaden
Japan Tourism Agency Commissioner Award for Domestic Tourism- Fukuyama Masaharu
TV Navi Awards for Best Principal Male Actor 2010 – Fukuyama Masaharu
4th Int'l Drama Festival, Tokyo Drama Award: Best Drama (Series Drama)
4th Int'l Drama Festival, Tokyo Drama Award: Best Performance by an Actor in a Supporting Role – Kagawa Teruyuki 
4th Int'l Drama Festival, Tokyo Drama Award: Special Award – Filming staff of "Ryomaden"
2011 Elan d'Or Awards: Best Series (TV Guide Award) 
2011 Elan d'Or Awards: Best Producer (TV) – Suzuki Kei 
2011 Elan d'Or Awards: Newcomers of the Year – Kiritani Kenta & Sato Takeru
2011 Elan d'Or Awards: Special Prize – Terajima Shinobu
2011 Galaxy Awards: Special Award for Contribution to Art (Television category) Individual Award – Fukuyama Masaharu

References

External links

2010 NHK Taiga drama exhibitions "Ryōmaden"
Edo-Tokyo Museum 2010 NHK Taiga drama exhibitions "Ryōmaden"
The Museum of Kyoto 2010 NHK Taiga drama exhibitions "Ryōmaden"
Kōchi Prefectural Museum of History 2010 NHK Taiga drama exhibitions "Ryōmaden"
Nagasaki Museum of History and Culture 2010 NHK Taiga drama exhibitions "Ryōmaden"
VL Japan Channel website

< Tenchijin | Taiga drama | Gō >

Taiga drama
2010 Japanese television series debuts
2010 Japanese television series endings
Jidaigeki
Television shows written by Yasushi Fukuda
Television series set in the 1850s
Television series set in the 1860s
Cultural depictions of Tokugawa Yoshinobu
Television shows set in Nagasaki Prefecture
Television shows set in Kōchi Prefecture
Television shows set in Kyoto